Rui da Silva is the name of

 Rui da Silva (field hockey) (born 1939), Hong Kong field hockey player
 Rui da Silva (athlete) (1951–1999), Brazilian sprinter
 Rui da Silva (DJ) (born 1968), Portuguese producer and DJ
 Rui Da Silva (R&D) (born 1969), Portuguese entrepreneur and inventor